Colwill is a surname. Notable people with the surname include:

Chris Colwill (born 1984), American diver
Les Colwill (born 1935), Canadian ice hockey player
Levi Colwill (born 2003), English footballer
Mark Colwill, English musician
Rubin Colwill (born 2002), Welsh footballer